The Ark of Mr. Chow is a 2015 Chinese period youth drama film directed by  Xiao Yang. It was released on June 19, 2015.

Cast
Sun Honglei as Zhou Zhiyong
Zhou Dongyu as Zhou Lan
Dong Zijian as Wu Wei
Wang Yuexin as Mai Ke
Zhao Lixin as Liang
Liu Xilong as Wang Dafa
Leo Li as Fang Houzheng
Wilson Wang as Qin Hai
CiCi Xia as Jiang Yilin

Reception

Box office
The film earned  at the Chinese box office.

Critical response
Derek Elley of Film Business Asia gave the film a 7 out of 10, calling it "entertaining but under-developed".

References

External links

Chinese comedy-drama films
Heyi Pictures films
2015 drama films
2015 films